West Virginia Route 956 (WV 956) is a  long east–west state highway in the northeastern portion of the U.S. state of West Virginia.  The western terminus of WV 956 is at the Maryland state line at Rocket Center, where it becomes Maryland Route 956 (MD 956) at the Potomac River crossing.  Its eastern terminus is at a T-intersection with WV 28 at Short Gap.  Along its path, WV 956 passes over Knobly Mountain.

WV 956 was formerly County Route 9/6, intersecting CR 9 near its east end at Short Gap.

Route description

WV 956 runs entirely within Mineral County. Heading southeast from the state line, WV 956 provides access to Allegany Ballistics Laboratory. The route then crosses Knobly Mountain, following a path in the shape of an sideways "U" amidst a heavily wooded terrain. WV 956 straightens out as it comes down from the mountain traveling to the southeast. Arriving in Short Gap, WV 956 comes to an end where it meets WV 28 at a T-intersection.

Major intersections

References

956
Transportation in Mineral County, West Virginia